Head end may refer to:

 cable television headend, the central facility serving a local area for cable television systems
 SMATV headend, Single Master Antenna Television, receives and rebroadcasts satellite TV throughout a property

See also
 Head-end power is the electrical power distribution system used in passenger trains